Hatoof (born January 26, 1989 in Versailles, Kentucky) is a Thoroughbred Champion racehorse who competed internationally out of a base in Chantilly, France under trainer Criquette Head for owner Sheikh Maktoum bin Rashid Al Maktoum. Racing at age 2 in France, Hatoof started three times, winning once and placing second on two occasions. The filly went on to great success during the next three years, winning major stakes races in the United Kingdom, Canada, and the United States. She was Champion in France in 1991 and 1993 and was voted the 1994 U.S. Eclipse Award for Outstanding Female Turf Horse.

Retired at the end of the 1994 racing season after finishing second to Tikkanen in the Breeders' Cup Turf, Hatoof later served as a broodmare for Gainsborough Stud Management Ltd. of Newbury, Berkshire.

Breeding Record

1996 Prospects of Glory (USA) : Bay colt (1st foal), foaled 24 January, by Mr Prospector (USA) - won 1 race and placed 3 times from 10 starts in Dubai, Britain and Italy 2002-3

1998 Mighty Isis (USA) : Bay filly, foaled 1 January, by Pleasant Colony (USA) - won 1 race; 3rd LR Prix de Thiberville, Deauville from 9 starts in France 2000-01

1999 Dubai Edition (USA) : Chestnut colt, foaled 1 January, by Mr Prospector (USA) - won 2 races and placed once in the United States and Dubai 2001-03

2004 Bochinche (USA) : Bay filly, foaled 23 January, by Kingmambo (USA) - unplaced in 2 starts in England 2007

2006 Loulou (USA) : Chestnut filly (7th foal), foaled 12 March, by El Prado (IRE) - won 1 race and placed once from 7 starts in England 2008-9

References
 Hatoof's pedigree and racing stats

1989 racehorse births
Racehorses bred in Kentucky
Racehorses trained in France
Eclipse Award winners
Thoroughbred family 25
1000 Guineas winners